Sarah Rose Troughton  (née Colman; born 3 May 1953) is the Lord Lieutenant of Wiltshire, appointed with effect from February 2012. She is the first woman to hold the position since it was created in the 16th century. A second cousin of King Charles III, for ten years she was lady-in-waiting to Katharine, Duchess of Kent. In 2022, she became one of the six women appointed as "Queen's companions" to Queen Camilla.

Early life

Troughton is the eldest of the five children of Sir Timothy Colman KG, a past Lord Lieutenant of Norfolk, and Lady Mary Cecilia Bowes-Lyon, a granddaughter of Claude Bowes-Lyon, 14th Earl of Strathmore and Kinghorne. Her maternal grandfather was a brother of Queen Elizabeth the Queen Mother, so that she is a first cousin twice removed of the present Earl of Strathmore and a first cousin once removed of Queen Elizabeth II. Her ancestor Jeremiah Colman (1777–1851) made a fortune from Colman's mustard, a business which eventually grew into Reckitt & Colman, of which her father was a director until 1989.

Public life
From 1990 to 2000, Troughton was lady-in-waiting to the Duchess of Kent.

Living at Wanborough, near Swindon, she became a trustee of the Community Foundation for Wiltshire and Swindon, a role in which she still serves, and is also President of Community First/Youth Action Wiltshire. She became a Deputy Lieutenant of Wiltshire in 2006. In December 2011, with effect from February 2012, she was promoted to the Lord Lieutenancy. Charles Petty-Fitzmaurice, 9th Marquess of Lansdowne, was her Vice-Lord-Lieutenant until 2016, and 
William Wyldbore-Smith now has that role. In 2011, she was chairman of the Chelsea Physic Garden, but retired from that role in 2020. 

As Lord Lieutenant, Troughton's public duties include overseeing arrangements for visits to Wiltshire by members of the Royal Family and escorting royal visitors; representing the King at events and presenting awards and medals on his behalf; liaising with the Wiltshire units of the Royal Navy, Army and Royal Air Force; leading the local magistracy as chairman of the Lord Chancellor's Advisory Committee on Justices of the Peace; and advising on nominations for national honours.

In January 2013, Troughton was made a Commander of the Order of St John by the Queen, and raised to Dame of the order in 2021.

In 2022, she was one of the first six women appointed as "Queen's companions" (replacing the traditional ladies-in-waiting) to Queen Camilla. A BBC News article described Troughton as one of Camilla's longstanding personal friends.

Personal life
In 1977 she married Peter Troughton (born 1948), a member of HM Diplomatic Service,  and the eldest son of Sir Charles Troughton, chairman of W H Smith. They have a son and two daughters. Her husband was later a director of the Lowland Investment Company PLC in the City of London, a trustee of the Royal Collection and Pro-Chancellor of the University of Bath. He is now a trustee of the Rothschild Foundation and a member of the Salisbury Diocesan Board of Finance.

Notes

1953 births
Living people
Dames of the Order of St John
Deputy Lieutenants of Wiltshire
Lord-Lieutenants of Wiltshire
Colman family
British ladies-in-waiting